Hillside is an unincorporated community in Derry Township, Westmoreland County, Pennsylvania, United States. Hillside does not have a post office.

Geography
Hillside is located in Derry Township in northeastern Westmoreland County  (40.368056, -79.260556). It lies on the west side of Chestnut Ridge.

Surrounding communities
Derry (southwest)
New Derry (southwest)
Blairsville (north)
Torrance (northeast)

References

Unincorporated communities in Westmoreland County, Pennsylvania
Unincorporated communities in Pennsylvania